Thomas Reichenberger (born 14 October 1974) is a German former professional footballer who played as a striker.

Honours 
 Bundesliga runner-up: 1998–99, 1999–2000

References

External links 
 
 Thomas Reichenberger Interview

1974 births
Living people
People from Bad Kreuznach
German footballers
Footballers from Rhineland-Palatinate
Association football forwards
Germany B international footballers
BFV Hassia Bingen players
SV Wehen Wiesbaden players
Bayer 04 Leverkusen players
Bayer 04 Leverkusen II players
Eintracht Frankfurt players
FC Energie Cottbus players
KFC Uerdingen 05 players
VfL Osnabrück players
Bundesliga players
2. Bundesliga players
3. Liga players
Regionalliga players